Menyuan Hui Autonomous County is a county in the northeast of Qinghai Province, China, bordering Gansu Province to the north. It is under the administration of Haibei Tibetan Autonomous Prefecture. Menyuan is situated on the Datong River between the Qilian Mountains and Daban Mountains. Gangshiqia Peak rises dramatically in the north of the county. It used to be called Menyuan in Chinese, with a different first character from the current name.

Climate

Transportation
 Lanzhou–Xinjiang High-Speed Railway (Menyuan railway station)
 China National Highway 227

See also
 List of administrative divisions of Qinghai
 Gangshiqia Peak

References

County-level divisions of Qinghai
Hui autonomous counties
Haibei Tibetan Autonomous Prefecture